Platinum End is a Japanese anime television series based on the manga series of the same name written by Tsugumi Ohba and illustrated by Takeshi Obata. On December 2, 2020, Pony Canyon registered the "Anime-PlatinumEnd.com" domain name, and on December 19, 2020, at the Jump Festa '21 online event, it was announced that the series would receive an anime television series adaptation by Signal.MD. Hideya Takahashi directed the "first series", while Kazuchika Kise is directing the "second series", with series composition by Shin'ichi Inozume, and character designs by Kōji Ōdate. Masahiro Tokuda is composing the series' music. The series is listed for 24 episodes, and aired on TBS, BS11, and other channels from October 8, 2021 to March 25, 2022. Band-Maid performed the opening theme "Sense", while Yuu Miyashita performed the first ending theme "Kōfuku-Ron" (Theory of Surrender). Kuhaku Gokko performed the second ending theme "Last Straw." Crunchyroll and Funimation licensed the series outside of Asia. Medialink licensed the series in South and Southeast Asia. Disney+ Hotstar started streaming the anime weekly in select Southeast Asian regions from January 5, 2022.

On October 28, 2021, Crunchyroll announced the series would receive an English dub, which premiered on November 18 of the same year.


Episode list

Home media release

Japanese

Notes

References

Platinum End